Westfield High School is a high school located in unincorporated Harris County, Texas, United States, near Houston.

The school, which serves grades 9-12, is a part of the Spring Independent School District. The school, in the Westfield community, has a Houston, Texas postal address. At one time it also served Remington Ranch.

History
In 1976, Spring High School 9th and 10th grade students were moved into a separate building called, "Spring High South." In 1981, Spring High South was converted into a four-year high school and was renamed, "Westfield."

In 2004, the district moved Westfield 9th grade students to a separate building. In 2009, Westfield 9th grade students were moved back into the main campus. In February 2017 the district proposed redrawing the attendance boundaries of its high schools; this would take effect in the 2020-2021 school year. The district also plans to establish one ninth grade center for each comprehensive high school.

Academics
For the 2018-2019 school year, the school received a D grade from the Texas Education Agency, with an overall score of 68 out of 100. The school received a D grade in two domains, Student Achievement (score of 68) and Closing the Gaps (score of 64), and a C grade in School Progress (score of 70). The school did not receive any of the seven possible distinction designations.

Demographics
The demographic breakdown of the 2,715 students enrolled for 2021–2022 was:
Male - 53.8%
Female - 46.2%
Native American/Alaskan - 0.4%
Asian - 3.5%
Black - 43.0%
Hispanic - 49.1%
Native Hawaiian/Pacific islanders - 0.1%
White - 2.6%
Multiracial - 1.3%

79.4% of the students were eligible for free or reduced-cost lunch. For 2021–2022, Westfield was a Title I school.

Attendance boundaries
School attendance within Spring Independent School District is determined by attendance boundaries. The district has different attendance boundary maps for each level: elementary, middle, and high school. Westfield High School's attendance boundary covers the southwestern area of the district.

Notable alumni
Ryan Bingham — singer/songwriter
Vaughn Eshelman — Major League Baseball (MLB) pitcher
Chad Fox — MLB pitcher
Brad Halsey — MLB pitcher
Cordel Iwuagwu - NFL football player
Lee Mays — National Football League (NFL) football player
Danny McCray — NFL football player
Ed Oliver — NFL defensive tackle
Mike Sirotka — MLB pitcher
Takia Starks — professional basketball player
Tony Ugoh — NFL offensive lineman
Steve Wisniewski — NFL offensive guard
Kim Zmeskal — gymnast
Wes Iwundu — NBA basketball player 
Tyrie Cleveland — NFL wide receiver

Notable People

Justin Outten - Former Assistant Football Head Coach, now Denver Broncos Offensive Coordinator. Former Green Bay Packers Tight Ends Coach.

References

External links 

 Westfield High School

Spring Independent School District high schools
1981 establishments in Texas
Educational institutions established in 1981